Cojedes may refer to:
Cojedes (state), one of the 23 states of Venezuela
Cojedes, Cojedes, a town in the Venezuelan state of Cojedes
Cojedes River, a river in Venezuela